Dalu or DALU may refer to:

Places
 Dalu, Meghalaya, India
 Dalu, Iran, a village in Kurdistan Province, Iran
 Dalu Station (大路站), in Yongdeng County, Gansu; station along the Lanxin Railway
 Dalu Subdistrict, Hegang (大陆街道), in Nanshan District, Hegang, Heilongjiang
 Dalu Subdistrict, Anshan (大陆街道), in Tiexi District, Anshan, Liaoning
 Dalu, Fangchenggang (大菉镇), town in Fangcheng District, Fangchenggang, China
 Dalu Township, Lingbi County (大路乡), Anhui
 Dalu Township, Tongshan County, Hubei (大路乡)
 Dalu, a village in Sânger Commune, Mureș County, Romania

Other uses
 A Matoran of Bionicle
 Directly Affiliated Local Union
 Dalu (大路), the Chinese name for the 1934 film The Big Road, and the 1991 film The Trail
 Dalu – "Thank you" in Igbo – one of the numerous Nigerian languages.

See also
 Dalu Town (disambiguation), for all towns named Dalu Town